Giovanni Montoya de Cardona or  Giovanni Montoja de Cardona (died 1667) was a Roman Catholic prelate who served as Bishop of Gallipoli (1659–1667).

Biography
Giovanni Montoya de Cardona was born in Naples, Italy.
On 4 December 1658, he was selected as Bishop of Gallipoli and confirmed by Pope Alexander VII on 9 June 1659.
On 15 June 1659, he was consecrated bishop by Francesco Maria Brancaccio, Cardinal-Priest of Santi XII Apostoli, with Stefano Quaranta, Archbishop of Amalfi, and Persio Caracci, Bishop Emeritus of Larino, serving as co-consecrators. 
He served as Bishop of Gallipoli until his death on 9 March 1667.

References

External links and additional sources
 (for Chronology of Bishops) 
 (for Chronology of Bishops) 

17th-century Italian Roman Catholic bishops
Bishops appointed by Pope Alexander VII
1667 deaths
Clergy from Naples